Baitul Ahad -The Japan Mosque or simply The Japan Mosque is an Ahmadi Muslim mosque, located in Tsushima, on the outskirts of Nagoya, in Aichi Prefecture. Opened on November 20, 2015, by Mirza Masroor Ahmad, the fifth caliph of the Ahmadiyya Muslim Community, the mosque is the largest in the country with a capacity for 500 persons.

See also
 Islam in Japan

References

Japan Mosque
Religious buildings and structures in Aichi Prefecture
Japan Mosque
21st-century mosques
Ahmadiyya mosques in Japan
Tsushima, Aichi